The Nigerian Entertainment Awards were established in New York City in January 2006. The awards recognize the contributions of African entertainers with a special focus on Nigerians.

Ceremonies
 2006 Nigeria Entertainment Awards
 2007 Nigeria Entertainment Awards
 2008 Nigeria Entertainment Awards
 2009 Nigeria Entertainment Awards
 2010 Nigeria Entertainment Awards
 2011 Nigeria Entertainment Awards
 2012 Nigeria Entertainment Awards
 2013 Nigeria Entertainment Awards
 2014 Nigeria Entertainment Awards
 2015 Nigeria Entertainment Awards
 2016 Nigeria Entertainment Awards

Categories
The following are the current categories as of 2016.

Musical categories
 Best Album of the Year
 Hottest Single of the Year
 Best Music Promoter
 Best New act of the Year
 Gospel Artist of the year
 Indigenous Artist of the Year
 Best Pop/R&B artist of the Year
 Female Artist of the Year
 Male Artist of the Year
 Best Rap Act of the Year
 Music Producer of the Year
 Best Music Video of the Year (Artist & Director)
 Best Collaboration
 Most Promising Act to Watch
 Diaspora Artist of the Year
 African Male Artist of the Year (Non-Nigerian)
 African Female Artist of the Year (Non-Nigerian)

Film categories
 Best Supporting Actor
 Best Actress in a Lead Role
 Best Supporting Actress
 Best Director of the Year
 Best Picture of the Year
 Best Short Film of the Year
 Best Actor of the Year (TV)
 Best Actress  of the Year(TV)
 TV Show of the Year
 Actor of the Year (Non-Nigerian)
 Actress of the Year (Non-Nigerian)
 Best Picture (Non-Nigerian)

Other categories
 Entertainment Personality of the Year
 Entertainment Executive of the Year
 Best OAP
 Funniest Comedian of Year
 Disk Jockey of the Year (Male)
 Disk Jockey of the Year (Female)
 Disk Jockey Collaboration of the Year
 Disk Jockey of the Year (Non-Nigerian)
 TV Presenter of the Year (Lifestyle)
 Fashion Model of the Year

2006-2008 NEA Awards

2006 NEA Awards
The first edition was held at the Clarice Smith Performing Arts Center at the University of Maryland, College Park on July 28, 2006 and was hosted by comedian Michael Blackson. The event featured performances by Sauce Kid, Sammy Okposo, and  Mike Okri. Tuface Idibia and Banky W were amongst the winners of the first edition.

2007 NEA Awards
The second edition was held at the NYU Skirball Center for the Performing Arts in New York City in June 2007 and was hosted by comedian Julius Agwu. The 2007 edition featured performances by Banky W, Iceberg Slim, Blak Jesus, and Mike Aremu.

Winners
 Best album of the year – Grass 2 Grace (Tuface Idibia)
 Hottest single of the year – "Why Me" (Dbanj)
 Best new act of the year – Tosin Martin
 Indigenous musician of the year – Lagbaja
 Best collabo of the year – P Square & Weird Mc (Bizzy Body Remix)
 Best afro pop act of the year – Dbanj
 Gospel artist of the year – Sammy Okposo
 Neo afrobeat artist of the year – Femi Kuti
 Best international album of the year – Return Of The King by eLDee
 Best international single of the year – "Capable" (Banky)
 Best international producer of the year – Mic Tunes
 Best international gospel choir rccg – Jesus House, DC
 Music producer of the year – Don Jazzy
 Battle of U.S. Based DJS – DJ Zimo
 U.S. Based entertainment promoter of the year – Big Moose Entertainment
 Athlete of the year – Obafemi Martins
 Fashion designer of the year Nigerian – Fabrics & Fashion
 Funniest comedian of the year – Julius Agwu
 Best international actor – Adewale Akinnuoye-Agbaje
 Best international actress – Adetoro Makinde
 Nollywood best actor – Ramsey Nouah (Dangerous Twins)
 Nollywood best actress – Stella Damasus Aboderin (Dangerous Twins)
 Nollywood best director – Tade Ogidan (Dangerous Twins)

2008 NEA Awards
The third edition was held at the NYU Skirball Center for the Performing Arts in New York City in June 2008 and was hosted by actor Raz Adoti (Amistad) and Tatiana from the 2007 season of Big Brother Africa. The 2007 edition featured performances by Dekunle Fuji and Tosin Martin. The event also featured Ramsey Noah and supermodel Oluchi's presentation of the Best Actor Award to actor Olu Jacobs.

Winners
 Best Album of the Year: ASA by Asa
 Hottest Single of the Year: "Yahooze" by Olu Maintain
 Best New Act of the Year: TY Bello
 Best Afro Pop Act of the Year: 9ice
 Best Gospel Act of the Year: Dekunle Fuji
 Music Producer of the Year: Dr Frabs
 Best Music Video of the Year: "Do Me" by P Square
 Best International Single of the Year: "Spray Me Money" Remix by Oladele ft. Eldee
 Best International Album of the Year: Chapter XIII by Keno
 Best International Producer of the Year: T Money
 Best International Music Video of the Year: "Wetin Man Go Do" by Amplifyd Crew
 International Event of the Year (presented to a promoter): NRC Reunion
 Best World DJ: DJ Humility
 Best Comedian: Basorge
 Best Film: Blessed Among Women
 Best Actor: Olu Jacobs
 Best Actress: Kate Henshaw
 U.S Based Promoter of the Year: Tribe X Entertainment

2009-present NEA Awards

2009 NEA Awards

In 2009, the fourth edition of the NEA Awards was held at Howard University's Cramton Auditorium in DC. The event was hosted by comedian Basorge and co-hosted by actresses Omoni Oboli and Ebbe Bassey. The event also featured performances by YQ, Midnight Crew, Toba Gold, Bigiano and J Martins.

Winners
 Best album of the year – Entertainer (D’Banj)
 Hottest single of the year – "Good Or Bad" (J Martins)
 Best new act of the year – M.I.
 Gospel artist of the year – Midnight Crew
 Music producer of the year – ID Cabasa
 Best rapper – M.I.
 Best music video of year – Not The Girl (Darey)
 Best international artist – Iceberg Slim
 Indigenous artist of the year – 9ICE
 Best international producer of the year – Dapo Torimiro
 Event of the year – This day/Arise NY fashion week by This day
 Best world DJ – DJ Neptune
 Best comedian – I Go Die
 Best actor – Jim Ikye
 Best actress – Funke Akindele

2010 NEA Awards

The 2010 edition was held at the third edition was also held on September 18, 2011 at the BMCC Tribeca Performing Arts Center in New York and was hosted by Singer Omawumi. The event featured performances by Lara George, Jesse Jagz, Omawumi, MI and Tuface Idibia. Lara George, Jesse Jagz, Omawumi, MI and Tuface Idibia also all received awards at this ceremony.

Winners
 Best album of the year – CEO (DaGrin)
 Hottest single of the year – "Free Madness" (Terry G)
 Best new act of the year – Jesse Jagz
 Gospel artist of the year – Lara George
 Most promising act to watch – Mocheddah
 Indigenous artist of the year – Nneka
 Best pop/R&B artist of the year – Omawumi
 Best rap act of the year – M.I.
 Best soul/neo soul act of the year – Tuface
 Music producer of the year – J. Sleek
 Best male music video of the year (artist & director) – "Implication" (Tuface) Godfather
 Best female music video of the year (artist & director) – "Today Na Today" (Omawumi) Kemi Adetiba
 Best actor in a film/short story – Jim Iyke (The Shepherd / Dream Maker)
 Best actress in a film/short story – Nse Ikpe-Etim (Reloaded)
 Best director – Kunle Afolayan (The Figurine)
 International event of the year (to a promoter) – Arise Fashion Week New York
 Entertainment personality of the year – Keke and D1
 Best actress in a TV series/reality/game show – Genevieve Nnaji (Guinness Ultimate Survivor Celebrity Edition)
 Best collaboration with vocals – "Kefee" ft. Time
 Best international artist – Wale
 Best international producer of the year – Kid Konnect
 Best actor in TV series/reality/game show – Gideon Okeke
 Best on screen personality (people’s choice award) – Denrele
 Best TV series/reality show/game show – Tinsel
 Best radio personality – Olisa Adibua
 Best comedian – A.Y
 Best world DJ – DJ Xclusive

2011 NEA Awards

The seventh edition was held on September 2, 2011 at the Symphony Space Sharp Theater in New York and was hosted by comedian Julius Agwu and actress Funke Akindele (aka "Jenifa"). The event featured performances by Jesse Jagz, Ice Prince, Waje, Sound Sultan, Sam Klef and MI. Lara George, Ice Prince, Waje, Sam Klef and MI all took home awards at this ceremony.

Winners
 Album of the year – MI2 (MI)
 Hottest Single of the Year – "Oleku" (Ice Prince)
 Best New Act of the Year – Wizkid
 Gospel Artist of the Year – Lara George
 Best Pop/R&B Artist of the Year – Waje
 Best Rap Act of The Year – M.I
 Music Producer of The Year – Samklef
 Best International Artist – Nneka
 Best Music Video of the Year – "Eni Duro" (Olamide) – DJ Tee
 Most Promising Act to Watch – Jhybo
 Entertainment Executive of the Year – Audu Maikori (Chocolate City)
 Indigenous Artist of the Year – Duncan Mighty
 Pan African Artist or Group of the Year – Fally Ipupa
 Best US-based Male Artist of the Year – Rotimi
 Best US-based Female Artist of the Year – Naira
 Best Actor in a Film/Short Story – Ramsey Nouah (A Private Storm)
 Best Actress in a Film/Short Story – Omoni Oboli (Anchor Baby)
 Best Picture (Producer) – Inale (Jeta Amata)
 Best Directing in a Film/Short Story – Lancelot Oduwa Imasuen/Ikechukwu Onyeka (A Private Storm)
 Best Actor in TV Series/Reality/Game Show – Frank Edoho (Who Wants To Be A Millionaire)
 Best Actress in TV Series/Reality/Game Show – Damilola Adegbite (Tinsel)
 Pan African Actress of the Year (Film/Short Story) – Jackie Appiah
 Pan African Actor of the Year (Film/Short Story) – Chris Attoh
 Comedian of the Year – Gordon
 Best World DJ – DJ Obi (Boston)
 Entertainment Promoter of the Year – Tiwaworks (Atlanta, USA)

2012 NEA Awards

The seventh edition was held on September 2, 2012 at the New York University Skirball Performing Arts Center in New York and was hosted by AY the comedian and actress Funke Akindele (aka "Jenifa"). The event featured performances by Brymo, Seyi Shay, Ice Prince, Vector, Waje, Banky W., Skales, WizKid. Appearances were made by Don Jazzy, Davido, Vivian Ndour, D'Prince, Sarkodie, Gbenga Akinnagbe, Uche Jumbo, Susan Peters, and Juliet Ibrahim.

Winners
 Best Album of the Year Superstar – Wizkid
 Hottest single of the year – "Dami Duro", Davido
 Best New Act of the year - Davido
 Gospel artist/group of the year - Tim Godfrey
 Best pop/r&b artist of the year - Wizkid
 Best rap act of the year - Vector
 Music producer of the year - Don Jazzy
 Best international artist - Tinie Tempah
 Best music video of the year – "Nawti" (Olu Maintain)
 Most promising act to watch – Eva
 Pan African artist or group of the year – Vivian Ndour
 Best US based artist of the year – Awon Boyz
 Best indigenous artist/group -Flavour
 Best collabo of the year - "Sauce Kid" ft. Davido (Carolina)
 Best actor (film) – Wale Ojo (Phone Swap)
 Best actress (film) – Funke Akindele (Troj)
 Best picture – Phone Swap
 Best TV Show – Big Brother Africa
 Best film director – Kunle Afolayan (Phone Swap)
 Pan African actor – Majid Michel (Somewhere in Africa)
 Pan African actress - Yvonne Okoro (Single Six)
 World DJ – Jimmy Jatt (Nigeria)
 Entertainment Executive of the year – Eldee

2013 NEA winners

Winners
 Best Album of the Year: YBNL – Olamide
 Hottest Single of the Year: "Kukere" – Iyanya
 Best New Act of the Year: Burna Boy
 Gospel Artist/Group of the Year: Sammy Okposo
 Best Pop/R&B Artist of the Year: Davido
 Best Rap Act of the Year: Ice Prince
 Music Producer of the Year: Spellz
 Music Video of the Year: Ghetto – "Shank" (Patrick Ellis)
 Most Promising Male Act to Watch: Endia
 Most Promising Female Act to Watch: Emma Nyra
 Eastern African Artiste or Group of the Year: Navio
 Western African Artiste or Group of the Year: Sarkodie
 Southern African Artist or Group of the Year: Zahara
 Best International Artiste: JJC Skillz
 Best Indigenous Artiste/Group: Olamide
 Best Collaboration: Ghost Mode – Phyno ft. Olamide
 Best Lead Actor in Film: OC Ukeje (Alan Poza)
 Best Lead Actress in a Film: Rita Dominic (The Meeting)
 Best Supporting Actor in a Film: Ali Nuhu (Blood and Henna)
 Best Supporting Actress in a Film: Tunde Aladese (Confusion Na Wa)
 Best Film Director: Tunde Kelani (Maami)
 Best Picture (Film Producer): Last Flight to Abuja (Obi Emelonye)
 Best TV Show: Big Brother Africa
 Best Pan African Actor: John Dumelo (Letters to My Mother)
 Best Pan African Actress: Nadia Buari (Single & Married)
 Best World DJ: DJ Bayo (UK)
 Best Comedian: Basketmouth
 Best Entertainment Promoter: Coko Bar
 Best Radio/TV Personality: Freeze of CoolFM
 Best TV Personality: Labi Layori
 Best Entertainment Blog: NotJustOk
 Best Entertainment Executive: Ubi Franklin
 Best International Actor: Dayo Okeniyi
 Best International Actress: Hope Olaide Wilson

2014 NEA Awards

The 9th year the Nigeria Entertainment Awards celebrated and honored members of the Nigerian entertainment industry in New York, at the NYU Skirball Center for Performing Arts. Performances included those of Wande Coal, Praiz, Oritsefemi, the 'Sekem' master MCGalaxy, and the crowd pleaser ShattaWale. Also on stage were Patoranking, who performed his popular song "Girlie O", and Skales with his new single "Shake Body".

Hosts for the night Bovi and Funke Akindele kept the audience entertained with jokes, while Gbemi Olateru-Olagbegi worked the audience by interacting and asking questions to keep them engaged and even more involved in the show than in years past.

Winners

Music categories

 Best Album of the Year - Baddest Boy Ever Liveth (Olamide)												
 Hottest Single of the Year - "Pull Over" (Kcee ft. Wizkid) / "Aye" (Davido) (tie)							
 Best New Act of the Year - Patoranking								
 Gospel Artist of the Year - Frank Edwards						
 Indigenous Artist of the Year - Oritshe Femi					
 Best Pop/R&B Artist of the Year - Tiwa Savage							
 Female Artist of the Year - Tiwa Savage								
 Male Artist of the Year - Davido	
 Best Rap Act of the Year - Ice Prince	
 Music Producer of the Year - Del B												
 Best Music Video of the Year (Artist & Director) - "Rands & Naira" (Emmy Gee & Nick)													
 Best Collaboration - "Gallardo" (Runtown Ft. Davido)											
 Most Promising Act to Watch - Ayo Jay	
 Diaspora Artist of the Year - L.A.X						
 African Artist of the Year (Non-Nigerian) - Shatta Wale	
																							
Film categories

 Best Actor in a Lead Role - Tope Tedela (A Mile from Home)																				
 Best Supporting Actor - Yomi Fash Lanso (Omo Elemosho)	
 Best Actress in a Lead Role - Funke Akindele in Agnetta (O'Mpa)	
 Best Supporting Actress - Genevieve Nnaji (Half of a Yellow Sun)	
 Best Director - Desmond Elliott (Finding Mercy)	
 Best Picture - Half of a Yellow Sun	
												
Other categories
 Entertainment Personality of the Year - Denrele Edun (Channel O)	
 Entertainment Executive of the Year - E Money (Five Star Music)	
 Best OAP - Yaw (Wazobia FM)
 Funniest Comedian of the Year - Bovi	 and baske mouth tie
 World DJ - DJ Spinall
 Best entertainment blog - Bella Naija ...

2015 NEA Awards

The 10th edition of the Nigeria Entertainment Awards was held on Sunday, the 6 September 2015 at the NYU Skirball Center for Performing Arts, New York. Nollywood actress Osas Ighodaro and Chocolate City artist, Ice Prince, anchored the successful event.

The sold-out event was attended by many celebrities, including Pasuma, Jerry Wonder, Kevin Lyttle, Fally Ipupa, DJ Abass, Juliet Ibrahim, DJ Cuppy, Sunkanmi, Ayojay, Emma Nyra, Bimbo Thomas, Ruth Kadiri, Destiny Amaka, Sonia Ibrahim, Chiney Ogwumike, Gbenro Ajibade, Jimmie, Maria Okan, Swanky Jerry, Mimi Onalaja, Tjan, and Toby Grey.

Performances included those by Yemi Alade, Praiz, MC Galaxy, Eddie Kenzo, Sheyman, Jaywon, Niniola, Mr. 2Kay, KAVHS, and Simi.

The show also had some industry business executives in attendance, such as Howie T (Baseline Records), Ayo Shonaiya, Jason Oshiokpekhai (Delta Airlines), Kobi Brew-Hammond (Arik Air), Dan Petruzzi (OkayPlayer), Abiola Oke (OkayAfrica), Chetachi Nwoga (Chibase), Jason Kpana (Tidal), Briant Biggs (Roc Nation), Roslin Ilori (Mtech), and Suilemana (Right Ent).

Also in attendance were prominent Nigerians from politicians to businessmen, including Hon. Demola Seriki, Comrad Timi Frank, Chief Terry Wayas, and Bankole Omishore.

Winners

Music categories
 Album of the Year: Thankful (Flavour)
 Hottest Single of the Year: "Ojuelegba" (Wizkid)
 Male Artist of the Year:  Wizkid
 Best Best Music Pro Of the Year: Fredoo Perry 
 Female Artist of the Year: Yemi Alade
 Best Pop Artist of the Year: Davido
 Rap Act of the Year: Olamide
 Best R&B Artist of the Year: Praiz
 Best Collaboration of the Year: "Bad Girl Special" Remix (Mr. 2 Kay)
 Best Dance Live Performance: MC Galaxy
 Best Music Video of the Year (Director): Unlimited L.A
 Best New Act to Watch: Kiss Daniel
 Indigenous Artist of the Year: Pasuma
 Diaspora Artist of the Year: Styleez
 Gospel Artist of the Year: Tope Alabi
 Most Promising Act to Watch: Simi
 Music Producer of the Year: Shizzi
 African Artist of the Year (Non-Nigerian): Eddie Kenzo
 Afrobeat Artist of the Year: 2face Idibia

Film/TV categories

 Actor of the Year (indigenous films): Adekola Odunlade
 Actor of the Year (Nollywood): Gabriel Afolayan
 Actress of the Year (indigenous films): Toyin Aimakhu Johnson
 Actress of the Year (Nollywood): Ruth Kadri
 Actress of the Year (Nigeria in Hollywood): Adepero Oduye
 Actor of the Year (Nigeria in Hollywood): Chiwetel Ejiofor
 Actor of the Year (Africa): Majid Michel
 Actress of the Year (Africa): Sonia Ibrahim
 Film Director of the Year (indigenous films): Olanrewaju Abiodun
 Film Director of the Year (Nollywood): Kunle Afolayan (October 1)
 Film Director of the Year (Africa): Alex Konstantaras
 Film of the Year (indigenous films): Alakada
 Film of the Year (producer, Nollywood): October 1
 Film of the Year (producer, Africa): Shattered Romance

Other categories

 Female Disc Jockey of the Year: DJ Cuppy
 Male Disc Jockey of the Year: DJ Kaywise
 Entertainment Executive of the Year: Tobi Sanni
 Entertainment Personality of the Year: Jimmy
 Entertainment TV Programme of the Year: Jenifas Diary
 OAP of the Year: Dotun (Cool FM)
 Comedy Act of the Year: Bovi

2016 NEA Awards

The 2016 Nigeria Entertainment Awards is the 11th edition of the Nigeria Entertainment Awards. Hosted by Richard Mofe Damijo and Ebbe Bassey, the event was held on September 4 at the BMCC Tribeca Performing Arts Center in New York City, U.S.

Winners
Music categories

 Album of the Year: Eyan Mayweather (Olamide)
 Hottest Single of the Year: "Mama" (Kizz Daniel)
 Song of the Year: "Pick Up" (Adekunle Gold)
 Afropop Artist of the Year:  Kizz Daniel 
 R&B Artist of the Year: Seyi Shay 
 Rap Artist of the Year: Olamide
 Gospel of the Year: Frank Edwards
 Dancehall Artist of the Year: Ketchup
 Indigenous Artist of the Year: Flavour 
 Alternative Artist of the Year: Aramide
 Best New Act to Watch: Adekunle Gold
 Most Promising Act to Watch: Mr. Eazi
 Diaspora Artist of the Year: Ayojay
 Best Collaboration of the Year: "My Woman, My Everything" Patoranking ft Wande Coal
 Best Live Performance of the Year: 2Baba
 Best Music Video of the Year (Director): "Unlimited L.A" Emergency (Dbanj)
 Africa Male Artist of the Year (Non-Nigerian): Shatta Wale
 Africa Female Artist of the Year (Non-Nigerian): Efya
 Music Producer of the Year: Masterkraft

Film/TV categories

 Lead Actor of the Year: Joseph Benjamin (Rebecca)
 Lead Actress of the Year: Fathia Balogun (Ishanna)
 Supporting Actor in a Film: Sambasa Nzeribe (A Soldier's Story)
 Supporting Actress in a Film: Osas Ighodaro (Gbomo Gbomo Express)
 Film Director of the Year: Frankie Ogar (A Soldier's Story)
 Best Picture of the Year: Ishanna
 Best Short Film of the Year: Bloody Taxi (Folasakin Iwajomo)
 Best Actor of the Year (TV): Folarin Falana (Jenifa's Diary)
 Best Actress of the Year (TV): Abimbola Craig – (Skinny Girl in Transit)
 TV Show of the Year: Skinny Girl in Transit
 Actor of the Year (Non-Nigerian): Abraham Attah (Beast of No Nation)
 Actress of the Year (Non-Nigerian): Nuong Faalong (Freetown)
 Best Picture of the Year (Non-Nigerian): Beast of No Nation

Other categories

 Female Disc Jockey of the Year: DJ Mystelle
 Male Disc Jockey of the Year: DJ Gravpop
 Disc Jockey Collaboration of the Year: DJ Kaywise ft. Oritse Femi – "Warn Dem"
 Disc Jockey of the Year (Non-Nigerian): DJ Gravpop DJ Slick Stuart & Roja
 Music Executive of the Year: Don Jazzy (Mavin Records)
 OAP of the Year: Tisan Jeremiah Bako (Raypower FM)
 TV Presenter of the Year (Lifestyle): Daala (Ovation)
 Comedy Act of the Year: Basketmouth
 Fashion Model of the Year: Mayowa Nicholas
 Online Comedy Act of the Year: Emmanuella

2017 NEA Awards

The 2017 Nigeria Entertainment Awards is the 12th edition of the Nigeria Entertainment Awards. Hosted by Singer Emma Nyra, the event was held on November 25 at the Symphony Space Peter Sharp Theater in New York City. The show featured performances by Olamide aka Baddo and also in attendance was Superstar Davido and his protege Mayorkun. Also in attendance were many notable names including Seyi Shay, Young Paris, Dremo, Sheyman, ID Cabasa, DJ Enimoney, Danagog, Dotman, D12, and many others.

Winners
Music categories

 Album of the Year: Glory (Olamide)
 Hottest Single of the Year: If (Davido)
 AfroPop Male Artist of the Year: Davido
 AfroPop Female Artist of the Year: Seyi Shay
 Rap Act of the Year: Olamide
 Best Music Promoter & Blogger: Prince Fredoo Perry 
 Dancehall Artist of the Year: Patoranking
 Best Collabo of the Year: Iskaba (Wande Coal & DJ Tunez)
 Best Music Video of the Year (Director): Meji Alabi (Yolo, Seyi Shay)
 Best New Act of the Year: Mayorkun
 Indigenous Artist of the Year: Phyno
 Best Promising Act Of The Year: Kaptain Kush
 Diaspora Artist of the Year: Jidenna
 Inspirational Artist of the Year: Sinach
 Most Promising Act to Watch: Deshinor
 Music Producer of the Year: Krisbeatz
 African Male Artist of the Year (Non-Nigerian): Toofan
 African Female Artist of the Year (Non-Nigerian): Becca

Film/TV categories

 Best Actor of the Year: Ransey Noauh (76)
 Best Actress of the Year: Funke Akindele (A Trip to Jamaica)
 Supporting Actor of the Year: AY (A Trip to Jamaica)
 Supporting Actress of the Year: Kehinde Bankole (The Dinner)
 Film Director of the Year: Steve Gukas (93 Days)
 Best Picture of the Year: The Wedding Party
 Best Lead Role in TV: Oreka Godis (Our Best Friend's Wedding)
 Best Lead Role in Film (Non-Nigerian / Africa): Korto Davies
 Best TV Show: Big Brother Naija

Other categories

 Nigeria Youngest Promoter of the Year: Prince Fredoo Perry 
 Best Disc Jockey of the Year: DJ Prince
 Diaspora Disc Jockey of the Year: DJ Phemstar (U.S.)
 Africa Disc Jockey of the Year: DJ Slick Stuat & Roja (UG)
 Entertainment Executive of the Year: Tobi Sanni Daniel
 OAP of the Year: Big Tak (Urban FM)
 TV Presenter of the Year: Seyitan (The Sauce)
 Best Comedy Act of the Year: Woli Arole & Asiri
 Photographer of the Year: Kelechi Amadi

2018 NEA Awards

The 2018 Nigeria Entertainment Awards was held on November 10th, 2018 at The UDC Performing Art Center, Washington, DC.

2019 NEA Awards

The 2019 Nigeria Entertainment Awards was originally scheduled to take place outside of the U.S. for the first time in Johannesburg, South Africa in November 2019 but was cancelled due to escalated cases of Xenophobia.

2020 NEA Awards

The 2020 Nigeria Entertainment Awards was originally scheduled for Fall of 2020 but due to the COVID19 pandemic, the Awards was rescheduled for 2021.

Executive team 

Current Executive Producers:
 Tope Esan
 Cosmas Collins
 Azeem Jolasun

Previous Executive Producers:
 Linda Ofukeme (2006-2006)
 Joy Tongo (2006-2008)
 Belinda Nosegbe (2006-2008)
 Seun Tagh (2006-2009)
 Dolapo OA (2006-2009)
 Martin Fayomi (2006-2015)

References

External links 
 http://www.neaawards.com

Nigerian music awards
Nigerian awards
2006 establishments in New York City
Awards established in 2006